Devdi or Deodi is a noble mansion where the Nawabs of Hyderabad lived. Dozens of them, with grand halls and serene courtyards, held the secrets of a distinct nobility.

The word devdi used to originally mean a hut, but the nobility started referring to their mansions as devdis in a deprecating way. Thus it came to be the word for the mansions of the nobles.

Today, only a few are left standing, in various states of decay. Some important devdis are: 

 Khurshid Jah Devdi
 Dewan Devdi
 Devdi Iqbal ud Dowla
 Fareed nawaz Jung devdi

References 

Hyderabad State